Thomas Chabot (born January 30, 1997) is a Canadian professional ice hockey defenceman and alternate captain for the Ottawa Senators of the National Hockey League (NHL). Chabot was drafted in the first round (18th overall) by the Senators in the 2015 NHL Entry Draft.

In January 2017, Chabot became the first defenceman to be named the most valuable player of the World Junior Championships.

Playing career
Chabot played in the 2009 and 2010 Quebec International Pee-Wee Hockey Tournaments with his minor ice hockey team from the Beauce-Nord area. He was drafted by the Saint John Sea Dogs in the second round (22nd overall) of the 2013 QMJHL Entry Draft, and he played 55 games with the Sea Dogs during the 2013–14 QMJHL season. The following season his outstanding play was rewarded when he was selected to play in the 2015 CHL/NHL Top Prospects Game.

Chabot attended the Senators' 2015–16 rookie and main training camps after taking part in Hockey Canada's National Team Summer Showcase held in Calgary during late-summer, playing in three preseason games with Ottawa. He was returned to Saint John on September 30, 2015, the same day he signed a three-year entry level contract with Ottawa. A year later, Chabot attended the Senators' 2016–17 training camp and made the team, making his NHL debut on October 18, 2016 versus the Arizona Coyotes. He was later returned to the Sea Dogs for his final major junior season after playing in one game with the Senators. At the conclusion of the 2016–17 season, Chabot earned the Sea Dogs' Top Defenceman Award and the Fans Choice Award.

To start the 2017–18 season, Chabot was sent to Ottawa's AHL affiliate, the Belleville Senators, where he recorded two goals and five assists in 12 games before being recalled by Ottawa in November. He scored his first NHL goal, along with two assists, in a 6–5 win over the New York Islanders on December 1, 2017. In his first NHL season, he finished with 9 goals and 16 assists for 25 points in 63 games, while averaging less than 18 minutes of ice-time per game.

Chabot had a breakout season in 2018–19, finishing with 55 points in 70 games, the 10th-highest among NHL defensemen. As the season progressed, his ice-time jumped to an average of 25 minutes per game and he assumed first-pairing duties. He was one of only three defensemen under the age of 25 to score 50 points or more, along with Jacob Trouba and Morgan Rielly. With Ottawa's top two scorers, Mark Stone and Matt Duchene, both traded at the deadline, Chabot finished the season as the team's leading scorer. Following the season, hockey writers began listing Chabot as one of the NHL's top defensemen, and in September 2019, he signed an eight-year, $64 million contract extension with the Senators.

In the seasons that followed, Chabot was the keystone player in Ottawa's defence corps, which was otherwise considered thin by many commentators. As a result he logged very high minutes per game. In the 2021–22 season he averaged 26:23 minutes of ice time per game, the highest for any player on any team in the league, until a March 16, 2022 hand injury caused by Columbus Blue Jackets forward Sean Kuraly ruled him out for the remainder of the year.

International play

Chabot played at the 2015 IIHF World U18 Championships where he won a bronze medal with Team Canada.

On December 1, 2015, Chabot was invited to the Team Canada selection camp for the 2016 World Junior Hockey Championships.

Chabot was selected as an alternate captain for Team Canada at the 2017 World Junior Ice Hockey Championships
 He helped guide Canada to a silver medal and was one of the top five scorers in the tournament.

On April 12, 2018, he was one of the 18 players to be named to the 2018 IIHF World Championship to represent Canada. He finished the tournament with 1 point in 6 games.

On April 29, 2019, he was again named to represent Canada at the 2019 IIHF World Championship. He helped Canada progress through to the playoff rounds before losing the final to Finland to finish with the Silver Medal on May 26, 2019.

He was named captain of Team Canada for the 2022 IIHF World Championship.

Career statistics

Regular season and playoffs

International

Awards and honours

References

External links
 

1997 births
Living people
Belleville Senators players
Canadian ice hockey defencemen
Ice hockey people from Quebec
National Hockey League first-round draft picks
Ottawa Senators draft picks
Ottawa Senators players
People from Sainte-Marie, Quebec
Saint John Sea Dogs players